Saturday Supercade is an American animated television series produced for Saturday mornings by Ruby-Spears Productions. It ran for two seasons on CBS.

Premise
Each episode is composed of several shorter segments featuring video game characters from the golden age of arcade video games.

The segments included:
 Frogger (from the Frogger arcade game)
 Donkey Kong with Mario and Pauline (from the Donkey Kong arcade game)
 Donkey Kong Jr. (from the Donkey Kong Jr. arcade game)
 Q*bert with Coily, Ugg, Wrongway, Slick and Sam (from the Q*bert arcade game)
 Pitfall Harry with his pet mountain lion Quickclaw and his niece Rhonda (unlike the others which are arcade games, this segment is from the home console game Pitfall!). The cartoon was simply called "Pitfall!".

Pitfall! and Q*bert rotated weekly while the other three were weekly.

During the second season, Q*bert (now weekly) and Donkey Kong remained while the Frogger, Pitfall! and Donkey Kong Jr. segments were replaced by shorts featuring:
 Kangaroo with friends and the "Monkey Business Gang" (from the Kangaroo arcade game).
 Space Ace with Space Ace/Dexter (depending on his form), Kimberly, and Borf (from the Space Ace arcade game).

Segments

Frogger
Frogger (voiced by Bob Sarlatte) is an ace reporter of the swamp who works at The Swamp Gazette. He and his friends Shellshock "Shelly" Turtle (voiced by Marvin Kaplan) and Fanny Frog (voiced by B.J. Ward) go out in search of crazy stories (sometimes about human behavior) to publish in the newspaper. Frogger also has to deal with his gruff boss and editor-in-chief Tex Toadwalker (voiced by Ted Field, Sr.). As in the game, he often has an encounter with an alligator or gets flattened by a passing car. Unlike the game, Shelly revives Frogger using an ordinary air pump.

Episodes
 "The Ms. Fortune Story" (September 17, 1983) - 
 "Spaced Out Frogs" (September 24, 1983) - 
 "The Who Took Toadwalker Story" (October 1, 1983) - 
 "Hydrofoil and Go Seek" (October 8, 1983) - 
 "The Great Scuba Scoop" (October 15, 1983) - 
 "The Headline Hunters" (October 22, 1983) - 
 "The Legs Croaker Story" (October 29, 1983) - 
 "The Blackboard Bungle" (November 5, 1983) - 
 "Good Knight, Frogger" (November 12, 1983) - 
 "Fake Me Out at the Ballgame" (November 19, 1983) - 
 "I Remember Mummy" (November 26, 1983) - 
 "Here Today, Pawned Tomorrow" (December 3, 1983) - 
 "Hop-Along Frogger" (December 10, 1983) -

Donkey Kong
Donkey Kong (voiced by Soupy Sales) has escaped from the circus. He is on the lam and Mario (voiced by Peter Cullen) and Pauline (voiced by Judy Strangis) are chasing the ape. As with the original game, Donkey Kong will often grab Pauline and Mario has to save her. Plots typically centered on them encountering crime with the villains conning the slow-witted Donkey Kong into doing their work and Mario and Pauline exposing the truth. After Mario and Pauline reveal the truth to Donkey Kong, the three of them team up to stop the antagonists' plans followed by Donkey Kong evading Mario and Pauline again.

Episodes

Season 1 (1983)

Season 2 (1984)

Pitfall!
Pitfall Harry (voiced by Robert Ridgely), his niece Rhonda (voiced by Noelle North), and their cowardly pet Quickclaw the Mountain Lion (voiced by Kenneth Mars) explore jungles for hidden treasures, having many different adventures along the way. Quickclaw and Rhonda later appeared in Pitfall II: Lost Caverns and Super Pitfall.

Episodes

Q*bert
In a 1950s-inspired world set in the town of Q*Berg, a teenage fur-covered creature named Q*bert (voiced by Billy Bowles), his girlfriend Q*Tee (voiced by Robbie Lee), his brother Q*Bit (voiced by Dick Beals), and his friends Q*Ball (voiced by Frank Welker), Q*Val (voiced by Robbie Lee), and Q*Mongus (voiced by Frank Welker) must deal with the resident bullies Coily, Ugg and Wrongway (all three voiced by Frank Welker), and Coily's girlfriend Viper (voiced by Julie McWhirter). As with the video game, the segment features "block-hopping" scenes, "swearing" bubbles, and occasional flying discs from the original game. New to the cartoon was Q*bert's use of "slippy-doos", a black ball projectile which he loaded and fired through his nose, producing an oil slick wherever the balls splattered. Slick and Sam (both voiced by Frank Welker) are also featured.

Episodes
 "Disc Derby Fiasco" (October 1, 1983) - 
 "The Great Q-Tee Contest" (October 15, 1983) - 
 "Q-Bowl Rigamarole" (October 29, 1983) - 
 "Crazy Camp Creature" (November 12, 1983) - 
 "Thanksgiving for the Memories" (November 26, 1983) - 
 "Dog Day Dilemma" (December 10, 1983) - 
 "Take Me Out to the Q-Game" (September 8, 1984) - 
 "Noser, P.I." (September 15, 1984) - 
 "Hook, Line & Mermaid" (September 22, 1984) - 
 "Q-Historic Daze" (September 29, 1984) - 
 "Q-bert's Monster Mix-Up" (October 6, 1984) - 
 "Game Shoe Woe" (October 13, 1984) - 
 "The Wacky Q-Bot" (October 20, 1984) - 
 "Q-Beat It" (October 27, 1984) - 
 "Q-Urf's Up!" (November 3, 1984) - 
 "Little Green Nosers" (November 10, 1984) -
 "Rebel Without a Q-Ause" (November 17, 1984) - 
 "Looking For Miss Q-Right" (November 24, 1984) - 
 "The Goofy Ghostgetters" (December 1, 1984) -

Donkey Kong Junior
Donkey Kong Jr. (voiced by Frank Welker) is sad to find that his father has run away from Mario and the circus. He befriends a greaser nicknamed "Bones" (voiced by Bart Braverman) who has a motorcycle and offers to help Junior by finding his dad together. Donkey Kong Jr's catchphrase is "Monkey muscle!", which he tells to himself and Bones to inspire self-confidence. Bones often serves as the voice of reason when Donkey Kong Jr. bites off more than he can chew.

Episodes
 "Trucknapper Caper" (September 17, 1983) - 
 "Sheep Rustle Hustle" (September 24, 1983) - 
 "Rocky Mountain Monkey Business" (October 1, 1983) - 
 "Magnificent Seven-Year Olds" (October 8, 1983) - 
 "The Ventriloquist Caper" (October 15, 1983) - 
 "The Great Seal Steal" (October 22, 1983) - 
 "The Jungle Boy Ploy" (October 29, 1983) - 
 "Junior Meets Kid Dynamo" (November 5, 1983) - 
 "The Amazing Rollerskate Race" (November 12, 1983) - 
 "A Christmas Story" (November 19, 1983) - 
 "Gorilla Ghost" (November 26, 1983) - 
 "The Teddy Bear Scare" (December 3, 1983) - 
 "Double or Nothing" (December 10, 1983) -

Kangaroo
Joey Kangaroo (voiced by David Mendenhall), his mother "K.O." Katy Kangaroo (voiced by Mea Martineau), and Sidney Squirrel (voiced by Marvin Kaplan) must stop the Monkeybiz Gang members Bingo, Bango, Bongo, and Fred (all four voiced by Pat Fraley and Frank Welker), four meddlesome monkeys who are known from making trouble at the local zoo run by the zookeeper Mr. Friendly (voiced by Arthur Burghardt). The Monkeybiz Gang would cause trouble by trying to escape from the zoo and Katy would have to help keep them in line.

Episodes

Space Ace
Space Ace (voiced by Jim Piper) is the always smiling self-confident champion of the "Space Command", whereas when always "wimping out" to Dexter (voiced by Sparky Marcus) after being hit by the Infanto-Ray, he becomes clumsy and weak. With officer Kimberly (voiced by Nancy Cartwright), he works for Space Marshall Vaughn (voiced by Peter Renaday) to keep the peace in the universe. They fight the evil alien commander Borf (voiced by Arthur Burghardt) and keep him from invading Earth. Ace and Kim try to keep his 'wimping' situation secret and pretend that Dexter is Kim's little brother to Vaughn.

Again, as with Donkey Kong, Ruby-Spears took artistic license; in the video game, Dexter had certain chances to revert to Ace, his full-grown self, whereas in the cartoon the Ace/Dexter phases seemed to happen on their own and often at inconvenient times for the hero.

It was aired late night on Cartoon Network in the late 1990s, and segments have been shown between programs on Boomerang.

Episodes
 "Cute Groots" (September 8, 1984) - 
 "Cosmic Camp Catastrophe" (September 15, 1984) - 
 "Dangerous Decoy" (September 22, 1984) - 
 "Moon Missile Madness" (September 29, 1984) - 
 "Perilous Partners" (October 6, 1984) - 
 "Frozen in Fear" (October 13, 1984) - 
 "Age Ray Riot" (October 20, 1984) - 
 "Wanted: Dexter!" (October 27, 1984) - 
 "The Phantom Shuttle" (November 3, 1984) - 
 "Spoiled Sports" (November 10, 1984) - 
 "Calamity Kimmie" (November 17, 1984) - 
 "Three Ring Rampage" (November 24, 1984) - 
 "Infanto Fury" (December 1, 1984) -

Cast
 Soupy Sales - Donkey Kong
 Dick Beals - Q*Bit
 Billy Bowles - Q*bert
 Bart Braverman - Bones
 Arthur Burghardt - Borf, Mr. Friendly
 Nancy Cartwright - Kimberly
 Peter Cullen - Mario
 Ted Field, Sr. - Tex
 Pat Fraley - Bingo
 Marvin Kaplan - Shellshock "Shelly" Turtle, Sidney Squirrel
 Robbie Lee - Q*Tee, Q*Val
 Sparky Marcus - Dexter
 Kenneth Mars - Quickclaw the Mountain Lion
 Mea Martineau - "K.O." Katy Kangaroo
 Julie McWhirter - Q*bertha, Q*Mom, Viper
 David Mendenhall - Joey Kangaroo
 Noelle North - Rhonda
 Jim Piper - Space Ace
 Peter Renaday - Space Marshall Vaughn, Legrin
 Robert Ridgely - Pitfall Harry
 Bob Sarlatte - Frogger
 Judy Strangis - Pauline
 B.J. Ward - Fanny Frog
 Frank Welker - Bango, Bongo, Donkey Kong Jr., Coily, Fred, Q*Ball, Q*Dad, Q*Mongus, Sam, Slick, Ugg, Wrongway

Additional voices

 Michael Bell
 Jack DeLeon
 Alan Dinehart - Mac
 Walker Edmiston
 Marshall Efron
 Al Fann
 Teddy S. Field III
 Takayo Fischer
 June Foray
 Linda Gary
 Kelly Glen
 Joe Higgins
 Bob Holt
 David Landsberg
 Lucy Lee
 Shawn Lieber
 Tress MacNeille
 Tysun McMullen
 Shepard Menken
 Nancy Merwan
 Don Messick - Q*Dactyl (in "Q*Historic Days")
 Tim Rooney
 Marilyn Schreffler
 Avery Schreiber
 Hal Smith
 Steve J. Spears
 John Stephenson
 Russi Taylor
 Herb Vigran
 Janet Waldo
 Alan Young
 Cameron Young

Rebroadcast and home video
The Space Ace segments from the show occasionally appeared as filler in between shows on Boomerang and Toonami.

The series has become considered partially lost in recent years due to a lack of rereleases and rebroadcast. In 2010, Warner Archive announced via their Facebook page that Saturday Supercade would be released through their made-on-demand DVD program, but some segments may be cut due to rights issues. As of 2022, no further information has been released.

In November 2015, Sony Pictures Home Entertainment released The Best of Q*Bert on DVD in Region 1. The two-disc collection features 17 of the 19 episodes of the series. This is a Manufacture-on-Demand (MOD) release, available exclusively in the US via Amazon.com and their CreateSpace MOD program.

References

External links
 
 
 Saturday Supercade podcast at The Retroist

1980s American animated television series
1980s American anthology television series
1983 American television series debuts
1984 American television series endings
American children's animated anthology television series
Animated series based on video games
English-language television shows
CBS original programming
Television series by Ruby-Spears
Television series by Sony Pictures Television